Gingold Theatrical Group, often abbreviated as GTG, is a New York-based non-profit theatre company. It was founded in 2006 by American actor and director David Staller. Its mission is to present works that carry the humanitarian values of writer and critic George Bernard Shaw. It presents several series, including the annual festival Shaw New York, and the monthly series of staged readings, Project Shaw. Through this series, GTG became the first theatre group to present all 65 of George Bernard Shaw's plays.

History and description
Gingold Theatrical Group is a Manhattan-based theatre company under the Artistic Direction of David Staller, who founded the group in 2006. Staller believed that the English playwright and critic, George Bernard Shaw, created work that made the strongest statements on human rights. He named the group after his friend Hermione Gingold, together with whom he read Shaw's plays. Stephen Brown-Fried serves as the group's Associate Director, and Alyce Stark is the group's general manager.

Project Shaw
Staller began the group's work with staged readings of plays either by Shaw, his contemporaries, or those inspired by him. The series, Project Shaw, presents 11 staged readings a year. Each of these staged readings are either plays by or inspired by George Bernard Shaw. In 2009, Gingold Theatrical Group became the first theatre group to have produced all 65 of George Bernard Shaw's plays through Project Shaw.  Initially held at New York's Players' Club, the performances were moved to a larger venue at New York's Symphony Space in 2014.

On January 19, 2015, Project Shaw held its 100th performance. As of July 2017, 124 Project Shaw had presented 124 concert productions.

Shaw New York
In 2012, the group began to hold an annual festival called Shaw New York. Here, they produce a fully staged production, together with symposiums, concerts, and staged readings. They began the annual festival with their production of Shaw's Man and Superman, which was a New York Times Critics' Pick. The play was co-produced by The Irish Repertory Theatre and was extended past its initial limited engagement. Since then, GTG has presented Shaw's You Never Can Tell and Major Barbara in a co-production with The Pearl Theatre, and Shaw's Widowers' Houses with The Actors Company Theatre.

In October 2022 David Staller directed GTG's production of Candida at NYC's Theater Row at 410 West 42nd St. It was "funny last-paced one-act feminist rom-com" and "wild and witty whirlwind of a story" reset from a London suburb to a 1929 Harlem Renaissance home with a mostly African- American cast.

New works
GTG currently holds two programs which focus on the development of new works. The first program, Press Cuttings, was inspired by Shaw's career. Prior to becoming a playwright, Shaw was an art critic. The program's focus is to develop the works of art critics looking to follow in Shaw's footsteps. This program led to the development of David Cote's play Otherland.

In 2017, GTG announced another program, Speakers' Corner, in which a group of writers of diverse backgrounds develops new work inspired by narratives of George Bernard Shaw.

Response
In New York Magazine, Jesse Green stated that "Gingold Theatrical Group provides an invaluable – and unique – service to New Yorkers. Not only does it keep topnotch productions of great works of art before the public on a regular basis as no other theater company can, but it also does something less obvious. It keeps the tradition of intelligent argument, embodied in Shaw's plays but otherwise much lacking from public discourse, alive for those who need it most: the thinking people of a great city."

In a 2012 review of Man and Superman, Andy Webster of The New York Times said that Staller's "fluency is apparent. … In its intellectual energy and exhilarating vivacity, this production honors Shaw’s life force as well."

Michael Musto stated, "David Staller's Project Shaw is an invaluable testament to the beauty of Shaw's work... Anyone who cares about theater and history treasures this project."

References

External links
 www.gingoldgroup.org
 Gingold Theatrical Group on New York City Arts

Off-Off-Broadway
Theatre companies in New York City
Theatre festivals in the United States
George Bernard Shaw
2006 establishments in the United States
Recurring events established in 2012